Clear Lake is an unincorporated community in Marion County, Oregon, United States, just north of Keizer.  It is west and north of Oregon Route 219 and east of Wheatland Road N.

It is likely named for Clear Lake which is approximately a half mile west of it, a disconnected meander of the Willamette River.

References

Unincorporated communities in Marion County, Oregon
Unincorporated communities in Oregon